A Nippon Professional Baseball roster is a list of players who are allowed by NPB Agreement to play in Nippon Professional Baseball's first leagues, the Central League and the Pacific League (NPB Agreement, Article 81). 
This list is created from each team's Registered players under control (NPB Agreement, Article 52)., and can be arbitrarily registered and unregistered at any time during the season (NPB Agreement, Article 85). Also, the results of the list changes are announced by the NPB organization every day during the season and can be viewed.

Summary
Players registered on the list are also said to be First squad player, and play in the first squad Central League and Pacific League. Other players are called Second squad players and Third squad players, and play in the second squad Eastern League and Western League, and play in unofficial games with independent leagues (NPB Agreement, Article 81, and Article 170). However, unlike the relationship between major leaguers and minor leaguers in the  Major League Baseball (MLB), the 1st, 2nd, and 3rd squad players all belong to the same team, and the only differences in contracts are the annual salary and contract period for each player.  Also, as mentioned above, if 10 days have passed since the player's registration was deleted, the team can re-register the player at any time during the season (NPB Agreement, Article 85). For this reason, it is often seen during the season that main pitchers and main players are repeatedly deleted and re-registered for strategic reasons such as reorganizing the rotation of starting pitchers.

Regulations
 Maximum number of registered players is 29 (Article 81.2 of the NPB Agreement). Among them, 25 players can be benched.
Currently (2022 season), up to 31 players can be registered due to special measures to prevent the spread of infection due to the effects of COVID-19, and up to 26 of them can enter the bench.

 The registration of foreigners stipulated in Article 82 of the NPB Agreement is limited to a maximum of 4 players, and up to 3 players can be registered as fielders or pitchers (Article 82-2 of the NPB Agreement).
(Example: fielder 1 and pitcher 3 or fielder 2 and pitcher 2 or fielder 3 and pitcher 1)

Currently (2022 season), up to 5 foreign players can be registered. However, there are only four conventional players who can enter the bench.

 If the player registration is deleted, you will not be able to participate in the official game of the first squad from that day, and you will not be able to re-register for 10 days (NPB Agreement Article 85).
In the Japan Series, this system does not apply because a roster of 40 players is created and players are selected from among them.

 All players will be de-registered if, for scheduling reasons, no matches are played for 10 days.

Exceptions
 Concussion registration deregistration special measures.
It refers to a measure that allows players who need to be deregistered due to suspected concussion to return even if it has not been 10 days since deregistration. Players who are eligible for concussion exemptions or who have been designated as replacements are allowed to return within 10 days.

 Special measures for registration of retired players.
When a retired player participates in an official match as a retirement match, the player can be added to the team's player registration only on the day of the retirement match (limited to one day).

 Special measures to prevent the spread of COVID-19 infection.
Currently (2022 season), up to 31 players can be registered. And up to 5 foreign players can be registered. However, there are only four conventional players who can enter the bench. Players suspected of having COVID-19 who have been de-enrolled may be re-enrolled within 10 days if they test negative.

Related regulations
 The minimum annual salary for first squad players is 16 million yen (NPB Agreement, Article 89–2), and players with an annual salary less than that can receive an amount that is multiplied by 1/150 of the difference and then multiplied by the number of days of registration.
 145 days of registration is used to calculate the one year required to qualify for free agency. If there are seasons that are less than that, the number of registered days will be added up between the seasons that have not yet reached, and 145 days will be calculated as one year.

See also
 Nippon Professional Baseball
 Nippon Professional Baseball Agreement
 List of current Nippon Professional Baseball team rosters
 Registration of players under control
 Developmental player system

References

External links
 Nippon Professional Baseball public notice 2022 - NPB.jp 
 Registration and deregistration of participating players - NPB.jp 
 Teams index - NPB.jp
 野球協約・統一契約書 - Japan Professional Baseball Players Association Official site 

Nippon Professional Baseball